Westover Comprehensive High School is a public high school located in Albany, Georgia, United States.

Westover High
Westover High School serves 9th through 12th grade students from the city of Albany, which is part of Dougherty County.

Westover High School ranks 180th of 386 Georgia public high schools. Dougherty County ranks 94th of 158 Georgia school districts. It has received a GreatSchools rating of 7 out of 10 based on its performance on state standardized tests.

Westover High boys' basketball won six State Championships (AAA) in 1990, 1991, 1992, 1993, 1998, and 2001.

Demographics
Student racial breakdown:
American Indian: 3
Asian: 16
Hispanic: 7
Black: 1,042
White: 130
Two or more races: 17

School stadium
Hugh Mills Stadium is used by all four public high schools: the Albany High Indians, Dougherty High Trojans, Monroe High Tornadoes, and Westover High Patriots football and track teams. It is also the host of the girls' state track meet for all five GHSA classifications. It is dedicated to Hugh M. Mills, the Albany High principal from 1923 to 1925. The stadium is located near Albany High School at 601 North Van Buren Street.

Albany High is the only school in the Dougherty County School System to have an on-site football stadium; because of this, all the high schools in Dougherty County use Hugh Mills as a home field. To alleviate confusion during games between schools, signs are posted at each of the entrance gates to designate the home team. If three schools have home games on the same weekend, games are played on Thursday, Friday, and Saturday nights.

Alma mater
Our hearts beat true, red, white, and blue,
We boast and we are bold,
When honoring the school we love,
The memories we will hold.
As patriots we will stand high.
We'll shout and we'll proclaim,
Forever proving that we take pride in your name.
Our loyalty we pledge to thee, Dear School, we'll ever try,
To make you proud we were a part of you,
Westover High.

Notable alumni
 Trent Brown - NFL offensive lineman and Super Bowl champion currently playing for the New England Patriots
 Joelle Carter- American Actress
 Rashad Greene - NFL wide receiver and return specialist for the Jacksonville Jaguars
 Gary Lee - former NFL wide receiver for the Detroit Lions
 Kurt Quarterman - former NFL offensive lineman with the Atlanta Falcons
 Troy Reddick - former AFL offensive lineman and ArenaBowl champion with the San Jose Sabercats
 Antwone Savage - former NCAA college football wide receiver and National Champion with the Oklahoma Sooners
 Trenton Thompson - XFL defensive lineman currently playing for the Houston Roughnecks
 Dontonio Wingfield - former NBA forward for the Seattle SuperSonics and Portland Trail Blazers

References

External links
Westover Comprehensive High School
Dougherty County School System

Public high schools in Georgia (U.S. state)
Schools in Dougherty County, Georgia
Buildings and structures in Albany, Georgia